Queen Ntfombi, The Queen Mother, Ndlovukati of Eswatini (born Ntfombi Tfwala; 27 December 1949) is the current Ndlovukati and joint head of state of Eswatini, serving since 1986. She was also regent of Eswatini from 1983 to 1986. She is the mother of King Mswati III.

Early life and marriage
Ntfombi married King Sobhuza II of Swaziland, with whom she had a son, Prince Makhosetive Dlamini.

In 1982 King Sobhuza designated another of his wives, Queen Dzeliwe, as the Ndlovukati to reign as joint sovereign with his future successor. Instead of recognizing one of her sons as his heir apparent, he indicated to his Loqoqo that he wanted Prince Makhosetive Dlamini to succeed him on the throne. In June 1982 he also extended the authority of the Loqoqo, empowering it to act as a "Supreme Council of State", free to appoint an "Authorised Person" to exercise the royal prerogative if a regent was deemed unable to do so properly.

Regency of Queen Dzeliwe
In the power vacuum that resulted from the death of Sobhuza II, Indlovukati Dzeliwe became Queen Regent during the minority of the designated heir to the throne, but the Loqoqo, consisting mostly of King Sobhuza's senior relatives, chiefs and advisors, usurped her authority and sacked Sobhuza's prime minister, Prince Mabandla Dlamini, whom Loqoqo members apparently feared would strip them of their new role. Once Prince Makhosetive Dlamini attained his majority and officially became king, his mother would then be expected to be designated as the new Indlovukati. However, Queen Dzeliwe was placed under house arrest in 1983. Following a 9-day period during which Swaziland was ruled by Prince Sozisa Dlamini, Ntfombi was selected as queen regent.

Indlovukazi

In 1986, when he turned 18, Makhosetive was crowned King Mswati III. Upon becoming king, as was the custom, he declared his mother to be the Indlovukazi (a title roughly corresponding to queen mother, literally translated as Great She-Elephant) and, as such, joint head of state. As queen mother, Ntfombi is seen as the spiritual and national head of state, while her son is considered the administrative head of state.

The Indlovukazi's image has been widely disseminated in the West since her inclusion in Andy Warhol's portrait series during her exercise of the regency for her son, as one of four Reigning Queens, along with Queens Beatrix of the Netherlands, Margrethe II of Denmark and Elizabeth II of the United Kingdom.

References

1950s births
Place of birth missing (living people)
Living people
Women rulers in Africa
Swazi women in politics
Swazi monarchs
African queens
20th-century women rulers
Year of birth missing (living people)